Gabriele "Lele" Oriali  (born 25 November 1952) is an Italian former footballer who primarily played as a defensive midfielder but could also play in defence. As a player, he was known in particular for his stamina, work-rate, ball-winning ability, and for his adeptness at breaking down opposition plays.

Oriali spent his club career initially with Inter, and subsequently with Fiorentina. At international level, he represented Italy at the 1980 European Championship, and was also a member of the team that won the 1982 FIFA World Cup. Following his retirement, he worked as a manager and as a sporting director.

Club career
A native of Como (Lombardy), son of an Italian father and a Romanian mother, Oriali played for the Inter youth team for four seasons before being promoted to the senior Inter squad; he would spend most of his career with Inter, making his professional debut for the club during the 1970–71 Scudetto winning season, and was an integral part of the Inter squad of the 1970s and early 1980s.

With Inter, he won the scudetto again during the 1979–80 season (scoring 6 goals), and the Coppa Italia twice; his first Coppa victory was during the 1977–78 season, whilst his second came during the 1981–82 season. In all he played 70 matches and scored 8 goals for Inter in the Coppa Italia competition.

Oriali played 45 matches and scored 3 goals for Inter in European cup competitions. He was part of the team that lost to Ajax in the 1971–72 European Cup final.

Oriali is also remembered for a heroic performance in a Milan Derby, played on 25 October 1981. In that game he scored the winning goal but also required thirty stitches having been booted in the face by the A.C. Milan defender Mauro Tassotti. That year Inter won both of its derby games, a feat that would not be repeated until 2007, 26 years later.

After winning the 1982 FIFA World Cup with Italy, and following the end of the 1982–83 season, he moved to Fiorentina where he played for four seasons. He retired from football in 1987 after 384 games (40 goals) in Serie A.

International career
Oriali was called up to the Italy national football team for the first time on 21 December 1978, under manager Enzo Bearzot, in a friendly against Spain, quickly earning a starting spot. His one and only goal for Italy came in a friendly against Sweden, which was played in Florence on 26 September 1979; the game finished in a 1–0 Italian victory.

Oriali played for Italy in the 1980 European Championship, where Italy finished in fourth place on home soil, losing to Czechoslovakia in a penalty shootout in the third-place match, after reaching the semi-final.

In 1982, he was a key member of the Italy National team that in Spain won the 1982 World Cup. Oriali appeared in five games at the tournament, including the victorious final against West Germany, which Italy won 3–1, to win their third FIFA World Cup. He was also featured in Italy's second round matches against Argentina and Brazil, in the "group of death", and he also appeared as Italy defeated Poland in the semi-final.

Oriali's last game for Italy was on 29 May 1983 against Sweden, played in Gothenburg, as part of the qualifying for the 1984 European Championship. Italy lost the game 0–2. In total, he made 28 appearances for Italy between 1978 and 1983, scoring 1 goal.

Managerial career
After finishing his playing career Oriali moved into the managing side of Italian football. First becoming a sporting director at Bologna, then at Parma. He returned to Inter in 1999 to become its technical director. He held that position until 2010 when it was taken over by another former Inter player, Marco Branca (who held the position until January 2014). In 2001, as technical director, he was sanctioned for his part in the Álvaro Recoba fake passport incident. Oriali returned to the role as technical director at Inter in 2019, and was also appointed as team manager of the Italy national team concurrently.

Style of play
Oriali did not have the best technical ability, but he was a tenacious and hard-working player, who was both tactically intelligent, and versatile; this allowed him to play anywhere in midfield, and also in defence, mainly as a full-back. Throughout his career, he distinguished himself for being a central or defensive midfielder with notable stamina, who excelled at reading the game and stopping opposing players; he was also an excellent man-marker. In addition to his work-rate, energy, and defensive abilities as a ball-winner, he was also known for his reliable distribution, and for having a tendency to receive and play many balls during matches. Due to his playing style, he was labeled an "incontrista" by the Italian press, a player whose sole responsibility was to break up plays and distribute the ball to another player to start an attack after winning back Possession. Considered one of the best Italian players of all time.  He was also highly regarded for his positional sense, as well as his ability to interpret the game and time his attacking runs, which allowed him to contribute to his team's offensive play with occasional goals.

In 2012, Oriali stated that the player who currently most resembled him in terms of his playing style was Daniele De Rossi, although, unlike De Rossi, Oriali was never sent-off throughout his career.

Trivia
 His face appeared on a Chad stamp in 1983–one of a series of stamps commemorating the 1982 World Cup. He appears on a 60 franc stamp alongside Włodi Smolarek of Poland.
 Oriali is cited in the Luciano Ligabue song Una vita da mediano (A life as a half back), one of his most popular songs. Ligabue is a known Inter fan.

Honours

Player

Club
Inter
 Serie A: 1970–71, 1979–80
 Coppa Italia 1977–78, 1981–82

International
Italy
 FIFA World Cup: 1982

Individual
 Italian Football Hall of Fame: 2019

Orders
  3rd Class / Commander: Commendatore Ordine al Merito della Repubblica Italiana: 2021

References

External links
 
 Oriali's statistics playing for Inter
 Oriali's statistics for the Italian National Team
 Oriali's detailed statistics for the National Team

1952 births
Living people
Sportspeople from Como
ACF Fiorentina players
Inter Milan players
Italian footballers
Italy international footballers
Italian people of Romanian descent
UEFA Euro 1980 players
1982 FIFA World Cup players
FIFA World Cup-winning players
Serie A players
Association football midfielders
Footballers from Lombardy
Commanders of the Order of Merit of the Italian Republic